Kidd is a surname. Notable people with the surname Kidd include:

 Albert Kidd (born 1961), Scottish footballer
 Alexander Kidd, British tug of war competitor
 Benjamin Kidd (1858–1916), British sociologist and writer
 Beresford Kidd (1865–1948), Anglican priest and historian
 Bill Kidd (born 1956), Scottish politician
 Billy Kidd (born 1943), American skier
 Billy Kidd (footballer) (1908–1978), English footballer
 Brian Kidd (born 1949), English footballer and coach
 Bruce Kidd (born 1943), Canadian athlete
 Carol Kidd (born 1945), Scottish singer
 Carl Kidd (born 1973), American football player
 Chip Kidd (born 1965), American graphic designer
 Culver Kidd Jr. (1914-1995), American politician
 David Kidd (disambiguation)
 Don Kidd (1937-2020), American politician
 Doug Kidd (born 1941), New Zealand politician
 Edward Kidd (1849-1912), Canadian politician
 Edward I. Kidd (1845-1902), American politician
 Eddie Kidd (born 1959), British stuntman
 Ellen Kidd (1852-1932), suffragist and pickle entrepreneur
 Ernest Kidd (1900–1974), English footballer
 Flora Kidd (1926–2008), English-Canadian writer
 Frederick Kidd (1921–1997), Canadian politician
 Gary Kidd (born 1985), Irish cricketer
 George Kidd (disambiguation)
 Glenna Sue Kidd (1933–2017), American baseball player
 Hilton Kidd (1922–2011), Australian rugby league footballer
 Ian Kidd (born 1964), Ice hockey player
 Isaac C. Kidd (1884-1941), admiral in the U.S. Navy
 Isaac C. Kidd Jr. (1919-1999), admiral in the U.S. Navy
 Jack Kidd (disambiguation)
 James Kidd (disambiguation)
 Jane Kidd, Canadian artist
 Jimmy Kidd, English footballer
 Jason Kidd (born 1973), American basketball player and coach
 Jodie Kidd (born 1978), English model
 John Kidd (disambiguation)
 Johnny Kidd (disambiguation)
 Joseph Kidd (1824–1918), Irish-born London doctor
 Joumana Kidd (born 1972), American actress and journalist
 Juanita Kidd Stout (1919–1998), American judge
 Kathryn H. Kidd (died 2015), American writer
 Keith Kidd (born 1962), American football player
 Kidd (Danish rapper) (born 1989), Danish rapper
 Leslie Kidd (1889–1984), English-born Irish cricketer
 Lewis Kidd (footballer) (born 1995), Scottish footballer
 Lewis Kidd (American football) (born 1997), American football player
 Mae Street Kidd (1904–1999), American businesswoman
 Marilyn Kidd (born 1964), Australian rower
 Maxx Kidd (1941–2017), American record producer
 Michael Kidd (1915–2007), American choreographer
 Michael Kidd (physician) (born 1959), Australian general practitioner
 Nikki Kidd (born 1987), Scottish field hockey player
 Paul Kidd, Australian writer
 Percy Kidd (1851–1942), English doctor
 Peter Kidd (born 1965), Australian judge
 Richard A. Kidd  (born 1943), ninth Sergeant Major of the Army of the United States
 Ronald Kidd (1889–1942) English civil rights campaigner
 Roy Kidd (born 1941), American football player and coach
 Rusty Kidd (1946-2020), American politician
 Ryan Kidd (born 1971), English footballer 
 Samuel Kidd (1804–1843) missionary and professor of Chinese at London University
 Stanton Kidd (born 1992), American basketball player in the Israeli Basketball Premier League
 Sue Monk Kidd (born 1948), American writer
 Sydney Kidd (born 1992), Canadian ice hockey player
 Thomas Kidd (disambiguation)
 Trevor Kidd (born 1972), Canadian ice hockey player
 Tyson Kidd (born 1980), Canadian professional wrestler
 Vince Kidd (born 1989), English singer
 Virginia Kidd (1921–2003), American writer and literary agent
 Warren Kidd (born 1970), American basketball player
 Wes Kidd, American music producer
 William Kidd (disambiguation)

Fictional characters
 Alex Kidd, a video game character and the former mascot of Sega before the introduction of Sonic the Hedgehog
 Stella Kidd, a character in Chicago Fire (TV series)
 Mr. Kidd, a James Bond villain from Diamonds Are Forever
 Bick, Beck, Tommy, and Storm Kidd, main characters of James Patterson's Treasure Hunters (book series)

See also
 Kydd (surname)
 Peter Kid (Kid is also a surname)
 Kid (nickname)

English-language surnames